NCR-CET or NCR College of Emerging Technologies is a private intermediate college located in Karachi, Pakistan providing Higher Secondary education (XI & XII). The college provides faculties of Pre Engineering, Pre-medical, Commerce and General Science , It is affiliated with Board of Intermediate Education, Karachi.

See also
List of colleges in Karachi
List of schools in Karachi
List of universities in Karachi
List of colleges in Karachi
Education in Pakistan

References

External links
Official website

Universities and colleges in Karachi